Scott Harris Friedman is an American songwriter, producer and musician best known for his work with Shawn Mendes and co-writing the song "Don't Let Me Down" by the Chainsmokers featuring Daya, which reached No. 1 on the US Mainstream Top 40 chart in 2016.

Career
Harris most recently executive produced Camila Cabello's album Familia (on which he co-wrote 10 songs), and co-wrote Role Model's single "Cross Your Mind," Shawn Mendes' single "When You're Gone," Shawn Mendes & Tainy's single "Summer Of Love," "As I Am (feat. Khalid)" for Justin Bieber and Dua Lipa's "We're Good." Harris co-wrote 12 songs on Shawn Mendes' fourth studio album, Wonder, 13 songs on Shawn's self-titled third studio album, Shawn Mendes, which debuted at No. 1 on the Billboard 200 chart, and 10 songs on Shawn Mendes' second album Illuminate including the lead single "Treat You Better" which reached the top 3 at the US Mainstream Top 40 chart, and "There's Nothing Holdin' Me Back which hit number 1 at the US Mainstream Top 40 chart.

Harris has also written songs for a number of artists, including Camila Cabello, JP Saxe, Selena Gomez, Dermot Kennedy, Alec Benjamin, Niall Horan, Meghan Trainor, Bebe Rehxa, X Ambassadors, Quinn XCII, Jon Bellion and Kygo; inclusive of his recent work with P!nk on her platinum-certified single, "Walk Me Home."

Songwriting discography

References

Year of birth missing (living people)
Living people
Singer-songwriters from New York (state)
Record producers from New York (state)
American male musicians
American male singer-songwriters